So Much Beauty is a studio album by Australian recording artist, Kate Ceberano. It was released on April 26, 2008.

Excluding the three new tracks, "So Much Beauty", "Stars and Satellites" and "Never Say Never", the remaining 9 songs are cover versions.  Ceberano co-wrote all three originals; she co-wrote "Never Say Never" with Eddie Chacon of Charles & Eddie.

Ceberano recorded it in co-producer’s Steve Scanlon’s lounge room, with the aim of keeping both herself and her band relaxed.

Track listing

Charts

References

2008 albums
Kate Ceberano albums
Covers albums